The Fnideq-Tetouan expressway is an expressway in Morocco. It begins in Morocco's northern city of Fnideq, and connects to the city of Tetouan.  The expressway's identity marker is "A7".

Autoroutes in Morocco
E